Hypsopygia joannisalis is a species of snout moth in the genus Hypsopygia described by Patrice J.A. Leraut in 2006. It is found in Ivory Coast.

References

Moths described in 2006
Endemic fauna of Ivory Coast
Moths of Africa
Pyralini